The Grand Hotel is a Grade II listed large hotel on Granby Street in the City centre of Leicester, England. It is now known as the Mercure Leicester City Hotel.

It was designed by Cecil Ogden and Amos Hall and built between 1897-98 by Orson Wright. The wedding-cake style top on the corner of Grandby Street and Belvoir Street was added by Amos Hall who also designed the Silver Arcade in the Edwardian period.

The Kings Hall with its ornate gilt capped columns, and extravagant use of decorative marble was envisaged by Orson Wright and designed by Amos Hall. Located on the first floor it could cater for 350 people, part was at one time a cinema.

The hotel has always been considered one of Leicester's most prestigious, but arguably its heyday was during Victorian times. Today the hotel is rated as 4 star and is operated by Mercure Hotels, a division of the multinational hotel company Accor.

References

External links
 Mercure Leicester City Hotel Website

Hotels in Leicestershire
History of Leicester
Buildings and structures in Leicester
Hotel buildings completed in 1898
1898 establishments in England
Grade II listed buildings in Leicestershire